Kati Abu ol Hasan Kola castle is a historical castle located in Babol County in Mazandaran Province, The longevity of this fortress dates back to the Historical periods after Islam.

References 

Castles in Iran